Ducky is a real-life nickname and a fictional given name. It may also refer to:

 Ján Ducký, Slovak politician and oligarch
 Ducky catamarans, a brand of inflatable catamarans
 Ducky, a Taiwanese brand of keyboard - see List of mechanical keyboards
 "Ducky", an episode of the web series Where's My Water?: Swampy's Underground Adventures
 Ducky, a character in The Land Before Time series of animated films
 Dr. Donald "Ducky" Mallard, a character in the television series NCIS

See also
 Duckie (disambiguation)